Arrawatta County, New South Wales is one of the 141 Cadastral divisions of New South Wales. It includes Ashford.  The name Arrawatta is thought to be derived from a local aboriginal word for the area that includes Arrawatta County.

Parishes 
A full list of parishes found within this county; their current LGA and mapping coordinates to the approximate centre of each location is as follows:

References

Counties of New South Wales